Wojciech Pawłowski (born 18 January 1993 in Koszalin) is a Polish professional footballer who plays as a goalkeeper for Polish IV liga club Elana Toruń.

In January 2012, he signed a pre-contract agreement with Udinese Calcio, but Lechia signed an agreement with Granada CF, which has the same owner.

On 4 July 2012, he officially joined Udinese.

On 7 August 2013, Pawlowski was loaned to Italian Serie B side Latina.

References

External links 
 
 
 

1993 births
Living people
People from Koszalin
Polish footballers
Association football goalkeepers
Poland youth international footballers
Lechia Gdańsk players
Śląsk Wrocław players
Udinese Calcio players
Latina Calcio 1932 players
Górnik Zabrze players
Widzew Łódź players
Unia Janikowo players
Elana Toruń players
Ekstraklasa players
I liga players
II liga players
III liga players
Polish expatriate footballers
Expatriate footballers in Italy
Polish expatriate sportspeople in Italy
Sportspeople from West Pomeranian Voivodeship